Jdiriya is a settlement in north-eastern Western Sahara. It is within the Moroccan-controlled area of the former territory, some 150 kilometres north of Tifariti and 60 kilometres northeast of Hawza. At the time of the 2014 census, the commune had a total population of 248 people.

References

Populated places in Laâyoune-Sakia El Hamra
Populated places in Western Sahara
Es Semara Province